Benzir Ahmed (born 29 February 1952) is a Bangladesh Awami League politician who has served as the member of parliament for Dhaka-20 since January 2019.

Early life 
Ahmed was born on 29 February 1952 in the village of Bainna, Dhamrai, Dhaka District, East Pakistan, Pakistan, the third child among four brothers and two sisters. He attended Manikganj Debendra College and Dhaka University. He has a M.A. degree.

Career
Ahmed was elected to Parliament in 2008 from Dhaka-20 as a Bangladesh Awami League candidate. He received the nomination to contest 2018 election from Dhaka-20. He is the president of the Dhaka District unit of the Bangladesh Awami League. He was the President of Bangladesh Association of International Recruiting Agencies(BAIRA). In 2022 BAIRA Election, he lost to the panel lead by Mohammad Abul Bashar.

References

Awami League politicians
Living people
1952 births
9th Jatiya Sangsad members
11th Jatiya Sangsad members